The Birmingham Bulls was a professional ice hockey team based in Birmingham, Alabama that briefly played in the Atlantic Coast Hockey League (ACHL) in October 1983.  Their home ice was the former Birmingham-Jefferson Civic Center (now Birmingham Jefferson Convention Complex) (BJCC)

History 
On July 28, 1983, Owner and Team President Mike McClure made the announcement that the team was joining the Atlantic Coast Hockey League. The team was looking to use the South Stars name, but on August 13, 1983 an announcement was made that they lost the rights to the name. Instead, McClure opted to use the Birmingham Bulls name.

Before the team took the ice, McClure admitted that "the future of the Bulls depends on the rental contract that they received from the BJCC." BJCC Director Casey Jones estimated that ice making would cost approximately $400 per day". and that "it's an expensive procedure, but we want hockey."

Coaching
Dave Hanson had previously played with the Bulls while they were part of the World Hockey Association (WHA) (1977–79) and the Central Hockey League (CHL) (1979–80). Going into the 1983-84 season, Hanson had expected to go to training camp with the New York Islanders with the plan of eventually being assigned to the Indianapolis Checkers. But after Checkers' head coach Fred Creighton did not return any calls and the season soon approaching, Hanson was starting to question his options. Creighton told Hanson that there weren't any available possibilities in the Islanders' organization because General Manager Bill Torrey had assigned a group of newer players to Indianapolis and he was not willing to make any changes for Hanson. Creighton told Hanson to go to Birmingham, stay in shape and be ready in the event of a recall. In the meantime, team owner Mike McClure (who Hanson knew from his time with the WHA Birmingham Bulls) contacted Hanson and inquired if he would be interested in coaching his new ACHL franchise. Hanson said that "he was looking to get into coaching" and former Bulls' coach Glen Sonmor said that Carlson "had a good character for it." On September 12, 1983, Hanson was announced as the Bulls' head coach.

Eviction and folding
On October 14, while the team was playing their first preseason game in Nashville, they were evicted from the Birmingham Jefferson Convention Complex as a result of being unable to pay the $50,000 rental fee they owed. Despite owing money, the Bulls moved forward and had scheduled to play their season opener. The deadline was extended by a week. At one point, the team had an anonymous donor who was willing to pay the $50,000 that was owed to the Birmingham Jefferson Convention Complex. On October 25, 1983, the donor withdrew their money and the Bulls were unable to provide the money owed to BJCC.

Several attempts were made to secure funding after the anonymous donor withdrew their commitment due to a local newspaper writing a critical article that was directed at the team's phantom owner. Birmingham Stallions owner Marvin Warner and actor Paul Newman, who Carlson had worked with in the movie Slap Shot were contacted for financing, but calls were not returned.

On October 28, 1983, as a result of ownership never paying the ACHL franchise fee along with the arena deposit, the ACHL suspended operations of the Birmingham Bulls. Their final regular season record was two victories and one loss. Coach Hanson resumed his playing career, joining the Toledo Goaldiggers. The remaining players were dispersed throughout the ACHL.

The Birmingham Bulls' name would remain dormant until 1992, when another franchise by the same name would join the East Coast Hockey League (now ECHL).

Players
Several Bulls' players were former NHL and WHA draft picks and/or have played in their respective leagues.

Schedule

Pre-season
10/14/1983 @ Nashville South Stars, 5-4 (Win)
10/18/1983 @ Nashville South Stars, 7-2 (Win)

Regular season
10/22/1983 @ Nashville South Stars, 2-5 (Loss)
10/25/1983 vs Mohawk Valley Stars, 8-0 (Win)
10/27/1983 vs Mohawk Valley Stars 7-3 (Win)

10/28/1983 - Birmingham Bulls franchise folds

References

External links
 Birmingham Bulls at HockeyDB.com

Ice hockey clubs established in 1983
Sports clubs disestablished in 1984
Defunct ice hockey teams in Alabama
1983 establishments in Alabama
Ice hockey teams in Alabama